Ernesto Gómez Gómez (born 26 April 1985), known simply as Ernesto, is a Spanish former professional footballer who played as a midfielder.

He appeared in 80 Segunda División matches over five seasons, totalling ten goals for Real Madrid Castilla, Málaga, Guadalajara, Recreativo and Lugo.

Club career
Ernesto was born in Madrid. After unsuccessfully emerging through local Real Madrid's youth ranks (he never made it past the reserves), he went on to represent Málaga CF, SD Ponferradina and AD Alcorcón.

On 27 October 2009, with Alcorcón, Ernesto scored against his first team in the Copa del Rey for a final 4–0 home win (4–1 on aggregate). With that and his following club, CD Guadalajara, he achieved consecutive promotions to the Segunda División, scoring a total of eight goals in the process. His first in that league arrived on 3 September 2011, when he closed the 2–0 away victory over Xerez CD.

Ernesto continued competing in the second tier from the 2012–13 to the 2014–15 seasons, appearing rarely for Recreativo de Huelva and CD Lugo due to injuries and also having a run-in with the latter's coach Quique Setién.

References

External links

1985 births
Living people
Spanish footballers
Footballers from Madrid
Association football midfielders
Segunda División players
Segunda División B players
Real Madrid Castilla footballers
Málaga CF players
SD Ponferradina players
AD Alcorcón footballers
CD Guadalajara (Spain) footballers
Recreativo de Huelva players
CD Lugo players
Spain youth international footballers